The 1974 Arizona Wildcats football team represented the University of Arizona in the Western Athletic Conference (WAC) during the 1974 NCAA Division I football season.  In their second season under head coach Jim Young, the Wildcats compiled a 9–2 record (6–1 against WAC opponents), finished in second place in the WAC, and outscored their opponents, 263 to 174.  The team played its home games in Arizona Stadium in Tucson, Arizona.

Despite a 9–2 record, the Wildcats were not invited to a bowl game due to not winning the WAC (BYU defeated Arizona in their head-to-head matchup to win the WAC) and at the time, under WAC rules, only the conference winner would earn a bowl bid, in which case, the Fiesta Bowl.

The team's statistical leaders included Bruce Hill with 1,814 passing yards, Jim Upchurch with 1,004 rushing yards, and Theopolis Bell with 700 receiving yards. Linebacker Mark Jacobs led the team with a school record 200 total tackles.

Schedule

Game summaries

Texas Tech
In a matchup of two top-20 teams, Arizona fell on the wrong end of it against Texas Tech, and lost in a low-scoring game for their first defeat of the season and ended their chances for an undefeated record.

BYU
After losing on the road at Texas Tech, the Wildcats returned home and faced BYU in a big test in the WAC. The Cougars would outplay the Wildcats to give Arizona their second straight loss and take control of the WAC. The loss ultimately prevented Arizona from winning the WAC, as BYU went on to clinch both the conference title and Fiesta Bowl berth.

Arizona State
In the regular season finale, Arizona battled Arizona State in the annual rivalry matchup. The Wildcats were looking to break a nine-game losing streak against the Sun Devils, with their last win occurring in 1964. Both teams held each other scoreless through the first three quarters before Arizona broke through in the fourth for a 10–0 shutout victory, and finally ended their decade-long streak of misery to ASU. To date, this remains the most recent shutout in the rivalry series and the only home win over the Sun Devils in the 1970s for the Wildcats. Also, it turned out to be Young's first and only win against ASU as Arizona's coach, as he would lose to them for the rest of his tenure. The victory led to the Wildcats winning nine games in a season for the first time in school history.

Roster

References

Arizona
Arizona Wildcats football seasons
Arizona Wildcats football